Sumarokovo is a rural locality (a village) in Kupriyanovskoye Rural Settlement, Gorokhovetsky District, Vladimir Oblast, Russia. The population was 1 as of 2010. There is an elk farm just outside of Sumarokovo called Sumarokovskaya Elk Farm.

Geography 
Sumarokovo is located on the Klyazma River, 17 km west of Gorokhovets (the district's administrative centre) by road. Khabalevo is the nearest rural locality.

References 

Rural localities in Gorokhovetsky District